The goodness factor is a metric developed by Eric Laithwaite to determine the 'goodness' of an electric motor. Using it he was able to develop efficient magnetic levitation induction motors.

where
 is the goodness factor (factors above 1 are likely to be efficient)
,  are the cross sections of the magnetic and electric circuit
,   are the lengths of the magnetic and electric circuits
 is the permeability of the core
 is the angular frequency the motor is driven at
 is the conductivity of the conductor

From this he showed that the most efficient motors are likely to be relatively large. However, the equation only directly relates to non-permanent magnet motors.

Laithwaite showed that for a simple induction motor this gave:

References

Induction motors
Dimensionless numbers
Magnetism